Archibald Stuart was a Virginian lawyer and politician.

Archibald Stuart or Stewart may also refer to:

Archibald Stewart (trade unionist), Australian trade unionist
Archibald Stewart (merchant) (died 1584), Provost of Edinburgh
Archibald Stewart (Lord Provost) (1697-1780) Lord Provost of Edinburgh and MP
Sir Archibald Stewart, 1st Baronet, of Blackhall, commissioner for Renfrewshire
Sir Archibald Stewart, 1st Baronet, of Burray, commissioner for Orkney and Shetland (Parliament of Scotland constituency)
Sir Archibald Stewart, 1st Baronet, of Castlemilk, commissioner for Renfrewshire (Parliament of Scotland constituency)
Archibald Stewart (American pioneer) from Kyle Ranch
Archibald Stuart, 13th Earl of Moray, son of Francis Stuart, 10th Earl of Moray
Archibald Stewart (rugby union) (1890–1974), Scottish rugby union player
Archie Stewart, American baseball player

See also
Archibald Stuart-Wortley (disambiguation)